Cas di torto (also called cas di lodo or cas di bara) is a traditional building technique from Aruba. It refers to a type of houses made of adobe with rounded corners. These houses were usually found around the plantations. The few structures that still exist are the oldest structures that are left standing in the country.

The technique probably came over from the Venezuelan Paraguaná Peninsula in the 18th century. Existing houses date back 150 years. Until 1925 many houses on Aruba were built using this technique, afterwards it fell into disuse. In 2005 there were 62 cas di torto houses left, of which only four were in good condition.

The skeleton of the houses is made up of round wooden poles placed with distances of 1.5 feet between them. Branches are interwoven between them, completing the structural support. On this basis, loam is applied, mixed with sand, water and para grass. This is then coated with aloe vera juice, which gives the white colour and helps to protect against the weather.

On top of the poles pieces of wood are fitted that serve as the base for the roofbeams. Until 1815 the roofing usually consisted of maize stems, afterwards the nuclei of columnar cacti were used. The floor is made of loam, mixed with cement or cow dung.

The houses were usually divided into a kitchen, a living room, a porch and a bedroom. In the kitchen would be a wooden or metal barrel for storing water that was collected in small rain ponds. Around this barrel a thick loam wall would be erected. Often large families would live in these houses; people would sleep on mats on the floor.

In the Arikok National Park some cas di torto houses can be visited.

References

External links
 Departamento Arubiana (2005) Cas di torto Biblioteca Nacional Aruba

Architectural styles
Aruban culture